Micheline Ostermeyer (23 December 1922 – 17 October 2001) was a French athlete and concert pianist. She won three medals at the 1948 Summer Olympics in shot put, discus throw, and high jump. After retiring from sports in 1950, she became a full-time pianist for fifteen years and then turned to teaching afterwards.

Biography
A great-niece of the French author Victor Hugo, and a niece of the composer Lucien Laroche, Ostermeyer was born in Rang-du-Fliers, Pas-de-Calais. At the insistence of her mother, she began learning piano at the age of 4, and at 14 she left her family's home in Tunisia to attend the Conservatoire de Paris. After the outbreak of World War II, she moved back to Tunisia where she performed a weekly half-hour piano recital on Radio Tunis.

It was during her return stay in Tunisia that Ostermeyer began participating in sports, competing in basketball and track and field events. After the war, she continued her participation in athletics while resuming her education at the Conservatoire. She competed in a range of contests, eventually winning 13 French titles in running, throwing and jumping events. In 1946, she placed second in the shot put at the European Athletics Championship in Oslo, as well as winning the Prix Premier at the Conservatoire.

The 1948 Summer Olympics were Ostermeyer's finest hour as an athlete. She won gold medals in the shot put and discus throw (despite having picked up a discus for the first time just a few weeks before the event), and a bronze medal in the high jump. She is the first French woman to win an Olympic medal in athletics. Her performance was overshadowed only by that of Dutch Fanny Blankers-Koen, who won four gold medals at the same London Olympiad. After winning the shot put, Ostermeyer concluded the day with an impromptu performance of a Beethoven concert at her team's headquarters and a concert at Royal Albert Hall.

She retired from sports in 1950 after having won two bronze medals at that year's European Championships, and continued to pursue a career in music. Her athletic prowess damaged her reputation as a concert pianist, however, and she even avoided playing anything composed by Franz Liszt for six years, because she considered him too "sportif". She toured for fifteen years before personal commitments, including the death of her husband, led her to take a teaching job, a post she held until her retirement in the early 1980s. In her final years she emerged from retirement to give a series of concerts in both France and Switzerland before her death in Bois-Guillaume.

At the 2016 Summer Olympics, Ostermeyer was inducted into the Olympians for Life project.

References

Bibliography

External links
 Official International Olympic Committee profile of Micheline Ostermeyer

1922 births
2001 deaths
Sportspeople from Pas-de-Calais
French female shot putters
French female discus throwers
French female high jumpers
Olympic athletes of France
Athletes (track and field) at the 1948 Summer Olympics
Olympic gold medalists for France
Olympic bronze medalists for France
20th-century French male classical pianists
European Athletics Championships medalists
Medalists at the 1948 Summer Olympics
Olympic gold medalists in athletics (track and field)
Olympic bronze medalists in athletics (track and field)
Conservatoire de Paris alumni
Chevaliers of the Légion d'honneur
Musicians from Tunis